Bardwell Mill is a hamlet located on Bardwell Mills Road in the Town of Remsen in Oneida County, New York. It is located south of Kayuta Lake.

References

Hamlets in Oneida County, New York
Hamlets in New York (state)